The 14th Pan American Games were held in Santo Domingo, Dominican Republic, from August 1 to August 17, 2003.

Results by event

Athletics

Road

Field

Boxing

See also
Nicaragua at the 2002 Central American and Caribbean Games
Nicaragua at the 2004 Summer Olympics

Nations at the 2003 Pan American Games
P
2003